High Security Vacation is a 2009 Russian adventure comedy film directed by Igor Zaytsev.

Plot
Viktor Sumarokov – experienced thief-recidivist nicknamed Sumrak is a person of authority to all prisoners. Yevgeny Koltsov is a former Ministry of Internal Affairs employee who is a well-deserved hero for courageous fighting in Chechnya. As a result of carelessness, he accidentally hurts a venal colleague. When the former lawman becomes imprisoned, chief of the penitentiary, lieutenant colonel UFSIN Vyshkin comes to Sumrak with a request to protect Koltsov from the threats of prisoners.

The ringleader's closest aide learns that he wants to protect Koltsov (since the higher authorities have arrived for a holiday arranged on the premises, and problems connected with the death of the prisoner-militiaman would be detrimental) and using the promise of an early release he persuades another inmate authority, Shaman, to start a commotion and remove Koltsov with the goal being to undermine Vyshkin. A fight begins in which Koltsov gets wounded and he is taken to the hospital together with wounded Sumarokov. Having recovered himself in the hospital, Koltsov realizes that he can not survive in the zone until Shaman retreats. Then he asks his combat friend, commander of the special forces of the Federal Penitentiary Service Sergey Gagarin, to help him escape from the hospital. In the process of suppressing the riot in the zone, Sumarokov is wounded by special forces. Koltsov trusts Sumrak and takes him along.

Gagarin hides the runaway convicts in a pioneer camp by the name of "Shipboy" where there is a shortage of male leaders. Now they call themselves Victor Sergeevich Romashkin and Yevgeny Dmitrievich Ubegaev. Children, honoring the pioneer traditions, mock their superiors in whichever way they can. However in attempts to make their squad the best and win a trip to St. Petersburg, the former convicts discover qualities in themselves which they never suspected before ...

Cast 
 Sergey Bezrukov as Viktor 'Sumrak' Sumarokov
 Dmitri Dyuzhev as Evgeni Koltsov
 Alyona Babenko as Tatyana Panteleeva
 Vladimir Menshov as Nikolai Vyshkin
 Lyudmila Polyakova as Zinaida Obraztsova
 Aleksey Kravchenko as Sergey Gagarin
 Sabina Akhmedova as Lena Bichkina
 Roman Madyanov as Klyk

Reception
The film received positive reviews.

References

External links 
 

2009 films
2000s adventure comedy films
Russian adventure comedy films
2000s Russian-language films